Max-Hervé George (born March 28, 1989) is a French entrepreneur, and property developer, and co-founder and CEO of Ultima Capital Group. George originally from Metz (France), and after a period in Switzerland, he is now based in London, UK.

He is also known for managing a rare financial investment instrument life insurance contract "à cours connu", and his associated long-running legal fight with insurer Aviva.

Early life and education
George is the youngest in the family, born March 1989, and grew up in Metz, France with his brother and sister. From a very young age George showed great interest in economics and finance.

After completing his baccalauréat in economics at the Institut Pilâtre de Rozier in 2008, George went on to study law at University of Paris X. He left university in 2010 to focus on his first business ventures in real estate investments and private equity.

Professional career

Ultima Capital 
In 2012, he co-founded Ultima Capital with Byron Baciocchi, the company has assets valued at over $1 billion in value.

In the same year, the Ultima Group acquired Sport Hotel Rutti in Gstaad, a jet-set favourite ski resort in Switzerland. The property was demolished and rebuilt as Ultima Gstaad hotel, which opened in December 2016.

In August 2019, Ultima Capital SA listed on the BX Swiss stock exchange. After the listing, George retained the position of CEO, a position he still holds.

Recent years
George purchased land, near Geneva, Switzerland and designed, developed and oversaw the construction to completion and launch of a commercial complex, which was sold in 2015. In 2015, George launched the Duchessa brand. The first boutique opened in Etoy in June 2016. Duchessa was sold to Geneva-based M3 Groupe in 2021. He is also the founder and chairman of Icona Capital, which at the end of 2022 acquired a 40% stake in Swiss real estate developer Stoneweg and launched a €8 billion investment platform.

In 2019, George appeared on the Forbes 30 under 30 list and featured on the cover of Forbes.

In June 2020, George has been described as one of the top prominent young entrepreneurs in Europe and has reportedly directly and indirectly participated in transactions in the billions of Euros and featured in the top 100 successful young people and the 300 richest by Swiss magazine Bilan. In 2022, George's personal fortune was reported to be estimated at between 400 million and 500 million euros.

George participated in several acquisitions including 20% of an independent Swiss private bank, and with two acquisitions in the real estate sector carried out in 2021: Liffey Park Technology Campus in Ireland acquired from Blackrock and a former bottling plant in Spain.

George is a partner of the International Judo Federation (IJF). He was present at the 2020 Summer Olympics in Tokyo alongside Marius Vizer, President of the IJF, and he presented the medals in the Judo Men Heavyweight category. He was pictured with HSH Albert II and French President Emmanuel Macron.

Aviva Lawsuit 
As of 2017, he has been fighting Aviva for 10 years, 15 if the years fought by his parents are taken into account.

By 2015, up to 50 court decisions had been rendered against Aviva France. In September 2014, the French Supreme court, the Cour de Cassation, ruled in favor of the George family, determining that the life insurance contracts, as drafted with the "known price" clause, are legally binding under French law. Nevertheless, George is still in court against Aviva, having won on the principle of the legality of the contracts, he now needs to have his prejudice recognized and valued in a second ongoing battle.

It is reported that at least 30 other people are in litigation with Aviva, with the possibility of thousands of similar contracts existing. Aviva has been repeatedly criticized for not disclosing the measure of the risks related to the "known price" contracts, "failing to show these potential losses on its books, it is also neglecting its duty to its shareholders and policyholders".

On 23 February 2021, Aviva sold its French business to Aema Group.

References

1989 births
French investors
Living people